SS Emperor was a steel-hulled Canadian lake freighter in service between 1911 and 1947. She was built between 1910 and April 1911 by the Collingwood Shipbuilding Company in Collingwood, Ontario, for Inland Lines, Ltd. of Midland, Ontario. She entered service on May 3, 1911. Emperor was sold to Canada Steamship Lines of Montreal, Quebec. Under the ownership of Canada Steamship Lines, she carried a wide variety of cargoes, but most frequently iron ore to Point Edward, Ontario, where it would be transported to Hamilton, Ontario, by train. After the opening of the fourth Welland Canal, Emperor carried the ore directly to Hamilton. She was involved in several accidents throughout her career.

After discharging a cargo of coal in Fort William, Ontario, on June 3, 1947, Emperor headed to Port Arthur, Ontario, where she loaded  of iron ore bound for Ashtabula, Ohio. She left Port Arthur at 10:55p.m. (EST). The weather was clear, and visibility was good. At midnight, Captain Eldon Walkinshaw handed over watch duties to first mate James A. Morrey. Emperor ran hard aground on Canoe Rocks, on the northeast point of Isle Royale shortly before 4:15a.m. on June 4. She sank in between 20 and 35 minutes. 12 of her crew were killed, while the 21 survivors were picked up by the United States Coast Guard Cutter Kimball.

Emperors wreck is the most recent, and second largest shipwreck of Isle Royale, surpassed only by the freighter Chester A. Congdon, which also wrecked on Canoe Rocks. Her bow lies partially broken up in shallow water, while her stern is intact and in deeper water. The wreck was listed on the National Register of Historic Places in 1984, and has become a popular site for recreational divers.

History

Background
In 1843, the gunship USS Michigan, built in Erie, Pennsylvania, became the first iron-hulled vessel built on the Great Lakes. In the mid-1840s, Canadian companies began importing iron vessels prefabricated by shipyards in the United Kingdom. The first iron-hulled merchant ship built on the Great Lakes, Merchant, was constructed in 1862. Despite the success of Merchant, wooden vessels remained preferable to iron ones until the 1880s, due to their inexpensiveness and the abundance of timber. In the early 1880s, shipyards around the Great Lakes began to construct iron ships on a relatively large scale. In 1884, the first steel freighters were built on the Great Lakes. By the 1890s, the majority of ships constructed on the lakes were made of steel. The late 19th and early 20th centuries saw a rapid increase in the size of lake freighters; the first  freighter was built in 1895, the first  freighter was constructed five years later.

Throughout the 1880s, the iron ore trade on the Great Lakes grew exponentially, primarily due to the increasing size of the lake freighters, and the rise in the number of trips made by ore boats to the ore docks of Lake Superior. As the railways were unable to keep up with the rapid production of iron ore, most of it was transported by bulk freighters.

Design and construction
Emperor (Canadian official number 126654) was built in Collingwood, Ontario, between 1910 and 1911, by the Collingwood Shipbuilding Company. She was launched into Collingwood harbour on December 17, 1910, as hull number 28; she was christened by James Playfair of Midland, Ontario. Emperor was built for the Playfair managed Inland Lines, Ltd. of Hamilton, Ontario.  Playfair was known to give the ships in his fleet names related to royalty. Emperor was ready to go into commission in April 1911. When she was completed, Emperor became the largest Canadian ship built to that date, earning her the nickname "The Pride of Canada". She was built exclusively for the iron ore trade.

Built with an arch-and-web frame system designed to create an unobstructed cargo hold, Emperor had 30 cargo hatches. There was an ore chute at each hatch. She was equipped with seven side-ballast and bilge tanks (each with a capacity of ), which were connected with seven steel pipes. The side and bottom tanks were not separated. This tank system enabled Emperor to quickly take on and discharge water. Emperor had 11 bulkheads. Her pilothouse, the captain's and mate's quarters were at the bow, while the crew's quarters were located at the stern.

Emperor had a gross register tonnage of 7,031 and a net register tonnage of 5,408.

Steam for the engine was provided by two coal-fired, single-ended   Scotch marine boilers. The engine and boilers were both built by the Collingwood Shipbuilding Company.

Service history

Emperor was accepted by Inland Lines, Ltd. after she ran her sea trials in Georgian Bay off Collingwood. She commenced her maiden voyage on May 3, 1911, sailing upbound, without cargo. While upbound on Lake Huron on May 17, Emperor broke her propeller shaft in Thunder Bay. She was towed to DeTour, Michigan, by the package freighter Superior, after which she was towed to Port Arthur, Ontario, for repairs. On June 16, 1911, the Richelieu & Ontario Navigation Company, Ltd. of Montreal, Quebec, acquired a controlling interest in Inland Lines, Ltd.

On October 18, 1911, Emperor was bound from Fort William, Ontario, for Midland with 310,000 bushels of wheat. Her stern went against the north pier, while her bow swung  into the channel, blocking it. She was raised on May 19, and after temporary repairs were made, she taken to Midland. Emperors captain, George Pearson said:I was not on the bast at the time of the accident, the steamer being temporarily in charge of the first mate. It is usual for a steamer leaving the lock to give a sharp blast, indicating to the canal crew that all is in readiness for the flood. In this case the flood was forced. As soon as the gates were opened the force of the water parted the lines of the steamer, causing her to leave the canal at high speed. The mate ordered an anchor dropped. The water at this point was not sufficiently deep to override the anchor, with the result that it was hit by the steamer and tore a hole in her bottom.
A court inquiry conducted in Collingwood by Dominion Wreck Commissioner L. A. Demmers determined that the canal employees were to blame for the sinking, as they flooded the lock without checking if Emperor was ready. The court further stated that it believed it was "customary for the master of a vessel to sound one blast of the whistle as a signal to the canal authorities to begin flooding", also adding that it "thinks it is extremely necessary that masters of all vessels should have copies of the regulations governing the operation of locks and canals". Emperors officers were acquitted of any wrongdoing, with the blame being placed on a watchman who "happened to be a deck hand, and therefore irresponsible".

In 1913, the Richelieu & Ontario Navigation Company, Ltd. was merged into the newly-formed, Montreal-based Canada Transportation Company, Ltd., the name of which was almost immediately changed to Canada Steamship Lines. While under the ownership of Canada Steamship Lines, Emperor carried a wide variety of cargoes, but mainly carried iron ore to Point Edward, Ontario, which was then taken to the steel mills of Hamilton, Ontario, by train.

While bound for a Lake Superior port, Emperor ran aground on Pointe aux Pins on the north shore of Lake Erie, on the morning of May 29, 1914. She was pulled off the next day by the tugs Hackett and James Reid. On October 29, 1926, Emperor ran aground near Mackinaw City, Michigan, on Major Shoal. She was freed at 16:00p.m., after jettisoning  of iron ore. Sometime before 1932, Emperor reportedly ran aground on an unknown object near Michipicoten Island, while on her way to Fort William.

While she was between Passage Island and Lamb Island, she lost her rudder. Emperor spent November 25 drifting in the storm. The tug James Whalen was sent to aid Emperor. However, before she arrived, the canaller Renvoyle arrived on the scene and towed Emperor to Fort William. One of Emperors deckhands was swept overboard in the storm, and drowned.

On May 4, 1937, Emperor was bound from Port Weller, Ontario, for Hamilton with a cargo of iron ore she loaded in Ashland, Wisconsin. Conditions on Lake Ontario were foggy, which caused Emperor to miss the port turn, which would then have put her on a course to the piers of the Burlington Canal at the entrance to Hamilton harbour. However, she carried on, eventually running aground near Bronte, Ontario, at 11:00p.m. The tug Rival and barge Londonderry arrived from Kingston, Ontario, to free her. After a portion of Emperors cargo was removed, she was refloated on May 6, having sustained hardly any damage.

In the spring of 1940, Emperors first mate James A. Morrey fell overboard from one of the bridge wings. He sustained no serious injuries.

Final voyage
After unloading a cargo of coal in Fort William on June 3, 1947, Emperor headed to the Canadian National Railway ore dock in Port Arthur, where she loaded  of iron ore from the Steep Rock Mine. The loading of the ore took six to seven hours. She left Port Arthur for Ashtabula, Ohio, at 10:55p.m. (EST), under the command of Captain Eldon Walkinshaw. Two of Emperors 35–man crew were left behind at Fort William. The weather was clement; there was little wind, and visibility was good. At midnight, Walkinshaw handed over watch duties to first mate James A. Morrey, who had supervised the loading of the iron ore. Shortly before 4:15a.m., Emperor crashed into Canoe Rocks, on the northeast point of Isle Royale, and broke in two.

About 10 minutes after Emperor struck Canoe Rocks, Walkinshaw gave the order to abandon ship. By that time, she had developed a serious list. The starboard lifeboat was successfully launched, but was leaking due to the absence of a bilge plug.  The port boat capsized when it was sucked under by Emperor as she sank. The night steward claimed that Emperors boilers exploded during the sinking. She sank in between 20 and 35 minutes. The United States Coast Guard Cutter Kimball, which was maintaining navigation lights in the vicinity of Blake Point, intercepted an SOS signal from Emperor, arriving on the scene in 35 minutes. After Kimball transported the 21 survivors and the body of cook Evelyn Schultz to Fort William, she travelled back to the wreck to search for survivors and bodies. Canada Steamship Lines also chartered the excursion boat Coastal Queen to assist in the search. However, bad weather prevented diver E. J. Fowler, who was on board Coastal Queen from reaching the wreck.

Investigation
The investigation into Emperors sinking proved to be difficult, as Walkinshaw, Morrey, and helmsman J. Prokup all died. An investigation carried out by the Department of Transport blamed Morrey, who they claimed "did not keep proper watch", for the sinking of Emperor. They determined that Morrey, who was meant to  be on watch duty until 6:00a.m., was likely sleep deprived at the time of the grounding, and had not made the usual navigational checks Emperor would have required to pass safely between Isle Royale and Passage Island. The courts criticised the prevailing system "which required the First Mate to be in charge of the loading of the ship during the period when he should have been off duty, resulted in his becoming overly tired, suffering as he was from a lack of sleep". Furthermore, Prokup, who was unacquainted with that part of Lake Superior, failed to detect the error in Emperors course. Also criticised were the usage of wooden lifeboats and the lack of lifeboat drills performed on board Emperor in 1947. The Board of Investigation fully exonerated Captain Walkinshaw, stating that "under all the circumstances he did everything possible most promptly and efficiently". They also praised the captain and crew of Kimball for their rescue of the survivors.

Aftermath
Emperor was the final and second-largest shipwreck to occur at Isle Royale. She was also the largest shipwreck to have occurred on Lake Superior since the loss of the freighter Chester A. Congdon in 1918, and the deadliest since the sinking of the canaller Kamloops in 1927, both also at Isle Royale. The first dives to Emperors wreck took place on June 12, 1947. They were conducted by Fowler, who made a total of three, roughly 30 minute dives to the wreck. In 1948, Canada Steamship Lines replaced Emperor with the freighter Burlington.

In 1975, sport divers from the Inland Divers Club of Duluth, Minnesota, discovered the preserved remains of a crew member near Emperors engine room and reported it to the National Park Service. The body was missing its eyes, nose and arms from the elbow down. However, the clothes, facial features and hair all remained intact. In order to deter potential looters, the body was later reportedly sunk at the end of the stern by Canadian divers. Soon after, the remains of one additional crew member were discovered resting on a bunk; the disposition of this body is unknown. Although unverified, several other bodies are reported to have been found.

Emperor wreck

The bow has sustained severe damage, mostly due to the impact of ice, while the stern is intact. The bow section includes two 7,000-pound (3,175.1 kg) anchors, a windlass and chain locker, as well as five relatively intact cargo hatches. The stern features an intact and penetrable engine room, an intact mast, and a partially intact cabin. Emperors boilers are undamaged, proving the night steward's account of a boiler explosion false. The roof on the port side of the cabin has partially collapsed, as the funnel (also present) fell on top of it with sufficient force to not only damage the roof, but also the bulkhead. There are 17 intact cargo hatches aft of the break in the hull. The propeller blades broke off as Emperor sank, leaving only the propeller hub and rudder. Her cargo holds still contain her cargo of iron ore.

Emperors wreck was listed on the National Register of Historic Places on June 12, 1984. Between 1980 and 1985, Emperor was the second-most popular shipwreck at Isle Royale National Park, behind the excursion steamer America. However, as of 2009, she is Isle Royale's most frequently visited shipwreck, accounting for over 350 of the 1062 dives made to the wrecks in the park that year.

Notes

References

Sources

External links
 
Death of the Emperor

1910 ships
Ships built in Collingwood, Ontario
Great Lakes freighters
Merchant ships of Canada
Canada Steamship Lines
Maritime incidents in 1911
Maritime incidents in 1914
Maritime incidents in 1926
Maritime incidents in 1936
Maritime incidents in 1937
Maritime incidents in 1947
Shipwrecks of the Michigan coast
Shipwrecks of Lake Superior
National Register of Historic Places in Keweenaw County, Michigan
National Register of Historic Places in Isle Royale National Park
Wreck diving sites in the United States